Luxolo Adams (born 1 August 1996) is a South African sprinter. He won a silver medal in Men's 200 m at the inaugural Athletics World Cup in 2018. In 2018 he competed at the African Championships in Asaba and won the bronze medal in the 200 metres.

In June 2022, he ran a personal best of 19.82 seconds for the 200 m to win the Paris Diamond League, defeating reigning Olympic champion Andre de Grasse in the race while recording the second-best mark in South African history.

References

External links

1996 births
Living people
South African male sprinters
People from Burgersdorp
Sportspeople from the Eastern Cape
20th-century South African people
21st-century South African people